Eugenia Berlin (1905–2003) was a Russian Empire-born Canadian sculptor, painter, designer and director.

Biography

Education and training

Berlin was born in Kharkov, Russian Empire and immigrated to Toronto, Ontario, Canada in 1925. She studied sculpture, drawing, and design at the L'Ecole des Beaux Arts in Geneva, Switzerland under James Vibert and Valentine Métein-Gilliard and privately under William Métein. She attended Central Technical School in Toronto, studying under Elizabeth Wyn Wood and Bobs Coghill Haworth. At the Chouinard School of Art, Berlin studied under Alexander Archipenko and attended the Alexander Archipenko School in New York City. Berlin's primary discipline was sculpture but she also worked in mixed media, pottery, watercolour, and painting.

She practised, and was friends, with some of the pre-eminent artists in Canadian history: Emanuel Hahn, Elizabeth Wyn Wood, Jacobine Jones, Frances Loring and Florence Wyle, as well as artists that included Albert Jacques Franck, EB Cox, AJ Casson, Paraskeva Clark, Harold Town, AY Jackson, JWG Macdonald and Doris McCarthy.

Exhibitions

Berlin exhibited at the National Art Gallery of Canada, Royal Canadian Academy, Montreal Museum of Fine Arts, London Regional Art Gallery, Art Gallery of Hamilton, Art Gallery of Toronto, Hart House at the University of Toronto, UNESCO Exhibition of Canadian Art in Paris 1946, Toronto Winter Fair, King City Public Library (solo exhibition); Eaton's Art Gallery, Roberts Gallery (1959), J.M. Dent and Sons, and the Canadian Portrait Academy.

Private life

Berlin was of Jewish descent and classified her occupations as 'teacher' and 'social worker' in a Canadian and U.S. Border Crossing Declaration in 1943. She remained single her entire life and lived with her brother, the noted Russian-Canadian composer and musician Boris Berlin, at Ferndale Ave, Toronto, then at 341 Bloor Street. Towards the end of her life Berlin lived at Seven Oaks, a long-term care home located at 9 Neilson Road, Toronto.

Career and honours

Berlin won a prize at the Toronto Winter Fair for her outdoor garden sculpture and two animal figures which were reproduced in "Canadian Art."

During Berlin's forty year plus career she was appointed Director of the Saturday Morning Club at the Royal Ontario Museum, a position she held until her retirement.

In 2000 Berlin was honoured by the Canadian Portrait Academy as honorary academician.

Collections

Berlin is represented with sculptures in the National Gallery of Canada with her portrait of Dr. Marius Barbeau and in the Corbet Collection of Canadian Women Artists with "Mourning Doves".

Notes

References
 Baker, Victoria. Emmanuel Hahn and Elizabeth Wyn Wood: Tradition and Innovation in Canadian Sculpture. Ottawa: National Gallery of Canada, 1997. 
 "Eagle- illustration." Canadian Art 8.2 (Spring 1951): 122.
 "Monkeys-Illustration." Canadian Art 8.2 (Spring 1953): 67. Hill, C.C. and P.B. Landry, eds. National Gallery Catalogue, Canadian Art. Ottawa: National Gallery of Canada, 1988.
 McMann, Evelyn de Rostaing. Royal Canadian Academy of Arts/Académie royale des arts du Canada: Exhibitions and Members 1880–1979. Toronto: University of Toronto Press, 1981.
 Ross, Malcolm ed. "Sculpture." The Arts in Canada. Toronto: Macmillan, 1958.
 http://www.toronto.ca/ltc/sevenoaks.htm
 A Dictionary of Canadian Artists, volumes 1–8 by Colin S. MacDonald, and volume 9 (online only), by Anne Newlands and Judith Parker
 National Gallery of Canada / Musée des beaux-arts du Canada

External links
 Eugenia Berlin at the National Gallery of Canada 
 Canadian Women Artists History Initiative listing for Eugenia Berlin

1905 births
2003 deaths
Ukrainian Jews
20th-century Canadian sculptors
20th-century Canadian women artists
Soviet emigrants to Canada